Burhanettin "Spezi" Kaymak (born 25 August 1973) is a former Turkish footballer who played as a defender. He also holds German citizenship. At his last club TSG Wörsdorf he served as the player-manager and resigned on 11 November 2011 for private and job-related reasons.

References

External links
 

Living people
1973 births
People from Bayburt
Association football defenders
Turkish footballers
Turkey under-21 international footballers
Eintracht Frankfurt players
Eintracht Frankfurt II players
Galatasaray S.K. footballers
SV Wehen Wiesbaden players
Bundesliga players
2. Bundesliga players